William M. Whiteford ( – August 3, 1936) was an American politician from Maryland. He served as a member of the Maryland House of Delegates, representing Harford County from 1896 to 1900.

Early life
William M. Whiteford was born around 1869 to Mollie (née Gladden) and James R. Whiteford. His grandfather was Samuel M. Whiteford, a state delegate. He graduated from Eaton & Burnett's Business College in Baltimore.

Career
Whiteford worked in the insurance and fertilizer industry in Cambria.

Whiteford was a Democrat. He served as a member of the Maryland House of Delegates, representing Harford County from 1896 to 1900.

Whiteford moved to Pittsburgh, Pennsylvania, around 1906 and worked in real estate and insurance.

Personal life
Whiteford married. They had two sons and four daughters.

Whiteford died on August 3, 1936, in Pittsburgh. He was buried in Pittsburgh.

References

Year of birth uncertain
1860s births
1936 deaths
People from Harford County, Maryland
People from Pittsburgh
Democratic Party members of the Maryland House of Delegates